Upton Park is a London Underground station on the District and Hammersmith and City lines, on Green Street in the Upton Park area of the London Borough of Newham, east London. It is in Zone 3.

The station was opened by the London, Tilbury and Southend Railway (LTSR) in 1877. District line service began in 1902, and the Hammersmith & City (at that time the Metropolitan line) followed in 1936. LTSR services were withdrawn in 1962. The station has two working platforms, one for each direction. Two other platforms used to serve the LTSR but are now disused.

Nowadays, the station serves Queens Road Market and Green Street.

History
Upton Park was the first station on the LT&SR to be built by a property developer. Read was a developer who proposed the station and given approval designed and built a two platform station between the houses of Queen's Road and Harold Road. The station fronted Queen's Square on the corner of Green Street and Queen's Road opened in September 1877. The building was demolished in 1903/04 when the line was quadrupled and the present station constructed.

Upton Park tube station appears in the English slang term, "He/She is Upton Park - two stops short of Barking", indicating that the individual in question is slightly mad.

Services
The service frequency is 15 services per hour on the District line and 6 services per hour on the Hammersmith & City line.

Connections

London Buses routes 58, 104, 330 and 376 serve the station.

Facilities

There are two ticket office windows, two touch screen ticket machines, and three of the more traditional coin-only button machines.

At present there are no lifts at the station for disabled access, nor are there plans to install any.

Trivia

 The station previously served as the local station for the Boleyn Ground, the home ground of West Ham United football club. However, this changed when in Summer 2016, West Ham United moved to the Olympic Stadium.

Gallery

References

External links

 
 

District line stations
Hammersmith & City line stations
Tube stations in the London Borough of Newham
Former London, Tilbury and Southend Railway stations
Railway stations in Great Britain opened in 1877